Quevauvillers is a commune in the Somme department in Hauts-de-France in northern France.

Geography

Population

History
The village of Quevauvillers first appears in Roman times as Equitum villa (residence of the riders) and would haver been a staging post on the Roman road from Amiens to Rouen. During the wars with the Normans near the end of the first millennium, the village was completely destroyed.

Personalities
Jean-Pierre Pernaut, television reporter, spent his childhood here.

See also
Communes of the Somme department

References

Communes of Somme (department)